Nature Reviews Cancer is a monthly review journal covering the field of oncology. It was established in 2001. The editor-in-chief is Anna Dart.

Abstracting and indexing
The journal is abstracted and indexed in:

PubMed
Science Citation Index Expanded
Scopus

According to the Journal Citation Reports, the journal has a 2021 impact factor of 69.800, ranking it 2nd out of 245 journals in the category "Oncology".

References

External links

Oncology journals
Nature Research academic journals
English-language journals
Monthly journals
Publications established in 2001
Review journals